Windwardtidesandwaywardsails is an album by Down by Law, released in 2003. It marked the first time since 1992's Blue that the same drummer played on two consecutive albums.

Track listing

References

Down by Law (band) albums
2003 albums